Twetwa is the name of several villages in Burma:

Twetwa (25°21"N 95°17"E), in Homalin Township, Sagaing Region
Twetwa (24°49"N 94°49"E), in Homalin Township, Sagaing Region